Xanthograpta basinigra is a moth of the family Noctuidae first described by Shigero Sugi in 1982. It is found in Korea, Japan, China and south-eastern Siberia in Russia.

References

External links
Image of adult
Image of adult

Acontiinae
Moths of Japan